Gurinder Kaur Kainth, popularly known by her stage name Miss Pooja is an Indian singer and actress who primarily sings Punjabi songs in Bhangra, Pop and Folk genres.

Personal life
Miss Pooja was born to Inderpal Kainth and Saroj Devi, a family of sikhs in Rajpura, Punjab.

She did B.A in Vocal and Instrumental Skills from Punjabi University. She also completed her M.A. in music from PGGCG Chandigarh and then B.Ed. in Music. Pooja also worked as a music teacher in Patel Public School, Rajpura.

Miss Pooja also joined BJP and was projected for the Hoshiarpur Lok Sabha reserved constituency.

Career
She started her professional career in 2006, with the release of a duet song, Jaan Ton Piyari. She also judges the Punjabi singing reality show Voice of Punjab.

In 2006, Miss Pooja debuted with her first duet song "Jaan Ton Piyari". In 2009, her debut solo album was "Romantic Jatt" and the music video of her song "Do Nain" from that album was shot in Toronto, Canada. In 2010, her first two films were "Panjaban" and "Channa Sachi Muchi". In 2012, the music video of her song "Shona Shona" from her third solo album "Jattitude" was shot in Hong Kong and she also made a debut in the Bollywood Industry with the song "Second Hand Jawani" from the film "Cocktail". In 2013, her third film was "Pooja Kiven Aa" and the fourth film was "Ishq Garaari".

Discography

Duo collaboration

Filmography

Awards and nominations
 In 2009 she won "Best International Act" at the UK Asian Music Awards.
In 2010 she won "Best International Album" at the UK Asian Music Awards for Romantic Jatt.
In 2010 she worn "Best Female Act" at the Brit Asia TV Music Awards.
In 2011 she was nominated for "Shri Tanveer Singh Dhami ji International Act" and "Best International Album" (for Panjaban) at the UK Asian Music Awards. and ended up winning Best International Act.
In 2011 she won PTC Punjabi Film Award Best Duet Female Film for Punjaban.
She was honoured with three certificates by International Book of Records for maximum music videos performances (850), for maximum songs sung (4,500) and maximum music albums released (300).

See also
 List of Punjabi singers
 Music of Punjab

References

External Dash

 

1979 births
21st-century Indian women singers
Living people
Punjabi-language singers
Musicians from Patiala
Punjabi people
Indian folk-pop singers
Indian women playback singers
21st-century Indian singers
Women musicians from Punjab, India
Singers from Punjab, India